"Polaris" is the second single from the album Twilight of the Innocents by the band Ash. It was released on 15 June 2007 in Ireland and the United Kingdom, and in the United States on 18 June 2007. It reached number 32 in the UK singles chart, and as of 2022 remains their last single to have reached the UK top 40 singles chart.

The band released the video for the song to their YouTube profile on 26 May.

B-side "Chinese New Year" first featured as an acoustic version in the Ash road-movie, "Episode 1: Road Movie" and can be found on the DVD format of "Burn Baby Burn".

Production
Tim Wheeler revealed that the song was written while he was on a break in the South of France. He said:

Track listings
CD
"Polaris (Album Version)" - 4:32
"Come On Over" - 4:55

7" Poster Bag
"Polaris (Album Version)"
"Kingdom Of Shadow"

7" Gatefold
"Polaris (Album Version)"
"Chinese New Year"

Download EP1
"Polaris (Album Version)"
"Polaris (Acoustic)"
"Polaris (Superbass Dub Remix)"

Download EP2
"Polaris (Demo)"
"Polaris (Superbass Remix)"
"Polaris (Root-id Re-Rub)"
"Polaris (Streetlife DJ's Remix)"

References 

Ash (band) songs
2007 singles
Songs written by Tim Wheeler
2007 songs